Azerbaijan Medical University named after Nariman Narimanov is the formal name of the public medical school located in Baku, Azerbaijan.  Due to difficulties with translation, the school is sometimes called: Azerbaijan Medical University, Azerbaijan State Medical University, Azerbaijan State Medical Institute, or simply Medical University, with any of the preceding including the "named after N. Narimanov" or full "Nariman Narimanov". The school is named after Nariman Narimanov, a famous Azeri in Soviet politics, notably party chairman of the Central Executive Committee of the Soviet Union.

History 
Founded on 9 May 1930, the medical school grew out of the Department of Medicine of Baku State University. During World War II, the institute trained 2,082 doctors. By the decree of the Presidium of the Supreme Soviet of the Azerbaijan SSR, the medical institute was named after a doctor and writer Nariman Narimanov on 29 April 1957. All further activities of the institute were associated with his name. In the fall of 2013, the University's Training and Surgical Clinic was opened.

Rectors 
The rectors of the medical institute were

 M. Kadyrli (1930)
 N. Mamedli (1931-1932)
 A. Aliev (1932-1934)
 M. Guseinov (1934-1935)
 A. Aliev (1935-1938)
 M. Aliev (1938-1942)
 Z. Mamedov (1943-1946)
 B. Eyvazov (1946-1964)
 H. Hasanov (1964-1968)
 B. Medzhidov (1968-1972)
 Z. Kulieva (1972-1983)
 Z. Mamedov (1983-1992)
 A. Amiraslanov (1992-2016)
 Garay Geraybeyli (since 2016)

Departments and faculties
The school has 8000 students in 74 academic departments, with a faculty of scientists, physicians and lecturers numbering just over 1000. There are 4 clinics, educational-dental, oncologic, educational-therapeutic clinic, educational-surgical functioning within the university.

 Curative I
 Curative II
 Dental
 Pharmaceutical
 Public Health
 Military Medical (since 2000)

Military Medical Faculty
The Military Medical Faculty under the Ministry of Defence prepares professional military medical officers in the Azerbaijani Armed Forces. It was founded on 25 May 2000. The duration of study is 2 years. Since August 2000, the male alumni of the Medical University completing their fourth year have been selected for admission to this faculty. The cadets have been admitted to the 1st course of "military doctors" faculty of the Military Medical School since 2006.

Affiliations
The university is a member of the Caucasus University Association. In the spring of 2017, the heads of the Azerbaijan Medical University (AMU) and Turkish Koç University signed a memorandum of cooperation. One of the main points of the memorandum was the consent to the exchange of doctors and residents.

Hostels 
University also provides hostels for its students. There are 6 student hostels: 2 of them are for girls, 2 for boys and 2 hostels for foreign students. The hostels are equipped with reading rooms, libraries, TVs, which allow watching world channels through satellite antennas.

See also 
 Healthcare in Azerbaijan
 Ministry of Healthcare of Azerbaijan
 Medicine in Azerbaijan

References

Citations

Sources 

 Ahliman Amiraslanov, Azerbaijan Medical University, Azerbaijan International, Winter 1995 (3.4). Accessed on April 17, 2006.

External links

AMU website
Azerbaijan Medical University named after N. Narimanov

 
Universities and institutes established in the Soviet Union
Science and technology in Azerbaijan
Educational institutions established in 1930
1930 establishments in the Transcaucasian Socialist Federative Soviet Republic
1930 establishments in Azerbaijan